The Chaqueña Passion Alliance is a political alliance in Paraguay.

History
The alliance was formed for the 2013 general elections. Led by the National Encounter Party, it also included the Authentic Radical Liberal Party, the Beloved Fatherland Party and the Democratic Progressive Party.

The alliance won a single seat in the Chamber of Deputies, taken by Julio Mineur.

References

Political party alliances in Paraguay